The William Kimbrough Pendleton House (also known as The Palms) is a historic house located at 1208 Chesterfield Court in Eustis, Florida. On January 13, 1983, it was added to the National Register of Historic Places.

Description and history 
The home is named for its most illustrious owner, William Kimbrough Pendleton, who moved here in 1886 in retirement; the house served as his home until his death. The house was expanded during his ownership and retains the look of that 1886 remodeling to this day.

Pendleton had served as the Second President of Bethany College. He was born in Yanceyville, Virginia, September 7, 1817, and died at Bethany, West Virginia, on September 1, 1899.

References

External links
 Lake County listings at Florida's Office of Cultural and Historical Programs

Houses on the National Register of Historic Places in Florida
National Register of Historic Places in Lake County, Florida
Houses in Lake County, Florida
Eustis, Florida
Pendleton family residences
Queen Anne architecture in Florida